Loxton Airport  is located  east of Loxton, South Australia.

See also
 List of airports in South Australia

References

External links
 Loxton Airport at the District Council of Loxton Waikerie

Airports in South Australia